Crassispira lavillei is an extinct species of sea snail, a marine gastropod mollusk in the family Pseudomelatomidae, the turrids and allies. Fossils have been found in Eocene strata in the Paris Basin, France.

References

 de Boury, E., 1899. Révision des pleurotomes éocènes du Bassin de Paris. La Feuille des Jeunes Naturalistes 29: 117–163, sér. 3° série
 Cossmann (M.), 1902 Catalogue illustré des coquilles fossiles de l'Éocène des environs de Paris (3ème appendice). Annales de la Société royale Malacologique de Belgique, t. 36, p. 9-110
 Cossmann (M.) & Pissarro (G.), 1913 Iconographie complète des coquilles fossiles de l'Éocène des environs de Paris, t. 2, p. pl. 46-65
 Le Renard (J.) & Pacaud (J.-M.), 1995 Révision des Mollusques paléogènes du Bassin de Paris. 2 - Liste des références primaires des espèces. Cossmanniana, t. 3, vol. 3, p. 65-132

External links
 Pacaud J.M. & Le Renard J. (1995). Révision des Mollusques paléogènes du Bassin de Paris. IV- Liste systématique actualisée. Cossmanniana. 3(4): 151-187

lavillei
Gastropods described in 1899